Guido Bentivoglio d'Aragona (4 October 15797 September 1644) was an Italian cardinal, statesman and historian.

Early years
A member of the Ferrara branch of the influential Bentivoglio family of Bologna, he was the younger son of marchese Cornelio Bentivoglio and Isabella Bendidio. After studying at the universities of Ferrara and Padua, where in 1598 he received a doctorate utroque jure— in both civil and canon law— he returned to Ferrara, to the humanistic studies that honed his elegant writing style. There Pope Clement VIII, on a visit to the city that had recently fallen under direct papal control, made him his private chamberlain, and he returned with Clement to Rome.

Nuncio in Brussels and Paris
Under Clement's successor, Pope Paul V, he was appointed titular archbishop of Rhodes, 14 May 1607, with a dispensation for being three months shy of the canonical age and not having yet received the sacred orders, in order to give him appropriate credentials as nuncio at the court of the Archdukes Albert and Isabella in the Habsburg Netherlands, (1 June 160724 October 1615).

He arrived in Brussels when negotiations between the Habsburgs and the Dutch Republic to end the Eighty Years' War were about to begin. Following the conclusion of the Twelve Years' Truce in April 1609, he was greatly concerned with the position of Catholicism in the Republic. Accredited to a Habsburg court, he likewise took a keen interest in the final stages of the reign and the succession of Emperor Rudolf II. 
Three more topics occupied a great deal of his time: the struggle over the Jülich-Cleves inheritance, which was set to ignite the Thirty Years War, the flight of the prince de Condé from France in objection to Henri IV's divorce and remarriage, and the degree of toleration for Catholics in England and Ireland under James I. His correspondence reveals Bentivoglio as "the skilled diplomatist, polished by constant intercourse with the most refined society, as well as the mature observer," according to Ludwig Pastor.

Afterwards he was nuncio to the Court of France (9 July 16161621), where he witnessed the uproars of the Regency of Queen Marie de' Medici, the fall of Concino Concini in the coup operated by Louis XIII and his favorite Charles d'Albert, the discord between the Queen-Mother and her son and the first Huguenot rebellions. The King rewarded his services as nuncio with the appointment on 11 July 1622 to the bishopric of Riez, a position from which Bentivoglio would resign on 16 October 1625.

Cardinal in Rome
In accordance to custom, Bentivoglio was made a cardinal on 11 January 1621 at the end of his mission at the Court of France. His first titular church was the San Giovanni a Porta Latina (installed 17 May 1621). He subsequently switched to the Santa Maria del Popolo (installed 26 October 1622), the Santa Prassede (installed 7 May 1635) and the Santa Maria in Trastevere (installed 28 March 1639). On 1 July 1641, his intimate friend, Pope Urban VIII appointed him to the suburbicarian see of Palestrina. Until his nomination to the order of cardinal-bishops, Louis XIII and Cardinal Richelieu had entrusted him with the post of Cardinal protector of France.

On 22 June 1633, Cardinal Bentivoglio was one of the signers of the papal condemnation of Galileo. An able writer and skilful diplomat, Bentivoglio was marked out as Urban's successor, but he died suddenly after the opening of the 1644 Papal conclave. He is buried in the church of San Silvestro al Quirinale, Rome.

Patron of the arts
Bentivoglio took Girolamo Frescobaldi with him to Brussels as his household composer.

On his return to Rome in 1621 Bentivoglio bought Cardinal Scipione Borghese's new palazzo on the Quirinale. Filippo Baldinucci, the biographer of Claude Lorrain, asserts that Cardinal Bentivoglio launched the artist's career by purchasing two landscapes by him, which brought the artist to the attention of Urban VIII.

He commissioned his portrait from Anthony van Dyck (illustration). His portrait bust was sculpted by François Duquesnoy "Il Fiammingo", a Flemish sculptor active in Rome

Main works 
 Della guerra di Fiandria (best edition, Cologne, 1633–1639). Bentivoglio's three volumes were translated in 1654, by Henry Carey, 2nd Earl of Monmouth (The Compleat History of the Warrs of Flanders, London, Humphrey Moseley, 1654)
 Relazioni di G. Bentivoglio in tempo delle sue Nunziature di Fiandria e di Francia (Antwerp, 1639; Cologne, 1630)
Lettere diplomatiche di Guido Bentivoglio (Brussels, 1631).
(Guido Bentivoglio) Costantino Panigada, ed. Memorie e Lettere (Bari: Laterza, series Scrittori d'Italia) 1934.

The complete edition of his works was published at Venice in 1668.

 Raccolta de Lettere Scritte dal Signor Cardinal Bentivoglio in tempo delle sut Nuntiature do Fiandra, e di Francia. (Posthumously by Angelo Zon, Venetia, 1670).

Notes

References

Further reading 
(Guido Bentivoglio), Memorie e lettere, edited by Costantino Panigada (Bari, 1934)
 Raffaelo Belvederi, Guido Bentivoglio e la politica europea del suo tempo, 1607-1621 (Padua, 1962)

External links 

 
 Cardinals of the Holy Roman Church: Guido Bentivoglio
 Catholic Hierarchy: Guido Cardinal Bentivoglio d'Aragona

1579 births
1644 deaths
17th-century Italian Roman Catholic bishops
Apostolic Nuncios to France
17th-century Italian cardinals
17th-century Italian historians
Religious leaders from Ferrara
Bishops of Riez
Apostolic Nuncios to Flanders
Writers from Ferrara
Politicians from Ferrara